In Greek mythology, Achilleus was the son of Zeus and Lamia, and the main subject of a minor myth.

Mythology 
Acheilus was a man of an irresistible beauty, and won a beauty contest judged by Pan, the god of wilderness. Aphrodite, the goddess of beauty and love, was irritated and so she made Pan fall in love with the nymph Echo, who spurned him, and made Acheilus become as ugly and unattractive as he had been pretty and attractive.

See also 
 Tiresias
 Actaeon
 Siproites
 Arachne

Notes

External links 
 ACHILLES from the Theoi Project

Children of Zeus
Demigods in classical mythology
Metamorphoses in Greek mythology
Deeds of Aphrodite
Deeds of Pan (god)